This is a list of national capitals ordered by elevation. Higher elevations typically have social, economic, and architectural effects on cities, in particular colder temperatures in winter. Low elevation cities are often seaports or are close to the sea.

The first country on the main list, Bolivia, is a country with multiple capitals; La Paz is the seat of the government while Sucre is the constitutional capital. If La Paz is considered the national capital, then it is ranked number one on the list. However, if Sucre is specified, then Ecuador's capital, Quito, is the national capital at the highest elevation while Sucre would be second.

The second list below contains several states with limited recognition.

List

Member and observer states of the United Nations

Other states (including de facto independent states, autonomous region and dependencies)

See also
List of cities by elevation

Notes

References

Altitude
 Capitals